Little Champ is a 2013 Philippine television drama that premiered on ABS-CBN from March 18, 2013 to May 24, 2013 and worldwide on The Filipino Channel replacing Kahit Konting Pagtingin in its timeslot and was replaced by Annaliza. It stars Lito Lapid, Jhong Hilario, and JB Agustin.

The series is streaming online on YouTube.

Synopsis
The story revolves around the simple lives of Caloy, his parents Lucas and Helen, and their sickly horse, Chalk.

Their quiet family life will change however when Caloy's playmate, the son of the rich haciendero Miguel, falls off a horse and dies. Miguel, who will put the blame on Caloy, will hunt the child down. Caloy will flee with his loyal horse Chalk and will find refuge under Leon del Torro, a barangay captain.

The forces of good and evil will clash when a meteorite falls, breaks into two, and lands separately on Chalk and Miguel. Powered by the meteorite, Chalk will change from a sickly horse to a powerful stallion that can talk while Miguel will experience evil powers, fueled by his lust for revenge.

Cast and characters

Main cast
 JB Agustin as Carlos "Caloy" Caballero
 Lito Lapid as Leon "Amang" del Torro
 Jhong Hilario as Lucas Caballero/Leon del Torro, Jr.
 Precious Lara Quigaman as Helen Caballero
 Jake Roxas as Miguel Suarez
 Mickey Ferriols as Xiu Xiang
 Katya Santos as Maricel
 Paolo Serrano as Badong
 Coleen Garcia as Alice
 Renz Fernandez as Jason

Supporting cast
 Ruben Gonzaga as Gorio
 Alex Calleja as Sarge

Guest cast
 Pen Medina as Elmer
 Alchris Galura as Tatay Bong
 Kim Atienza as himself
 Rez Cortez as Mr. de Leon
 Dionne Monsanto as Ofelia
 Ana Capri as Linda
 Tony Mabesa as Wycong
 Manuel Chua as Brix
 Gina Pareño as Shuning
 Wowie de Guzman as Bondoc
 Rafael Rosell as Salazar / Ulupong
 Yayo Aguila as Dahlia
 Izzy Canillo as Charlie
 Cacai Bautista as Josie
 Joko Diaz as Jose 
 Baldo Marro as Teroy
 Michael Roy Jornales as Oliver
 Jethro Ramirez as Tony
 Anica Tindoy as Sheryl
 Abegail Acan as Gracia
 Dimples Romana as Kara
 Jayson Gainza as Melchor
 Efren Reyes as Hector
 Justin Gonzales as Doy
 Franco Daza as Batch
 Helga Krapf as Faye

Special participation
 Jolo Revilla as Gio Suarez
 Mark Lapid as young Leon

Voice cast
 Maliksi Morales as Chalk
 Jane Oineza as Brown Sugar
 Eddie Garcia as Champion
 John Regala as Black Jack
 Rico J. Puno as Kurimaw
 Joonee Gamboa as Rango
 Jeffrey Tam as Astig

Soundtrack
OST Part 1
 Kung Kailangan Mo Ako - Piolo Pascual with the ABS-CBN Philharmonic Orchestra
 Kung Kailangan Mo Ako (Inst.) - ABS-CBN Philharmonic Orchestra
 Unravel - Seal Team

See also
 List of programs broadcast by ABS-CBN
 List of dramas of ABS-CBN

References

External links
 
 
 

ABS-CBN drama series
2013 Philippine television series debuts
2013 Philippine television series endings
2010s children's television series
Filipino-language television shows
Television shows set in the Philippines